Nicktoons (sometimes called Nicktoons Global) is a European international pay television network operated by Paramount Networks EMEAA. Launched on 1 February 2017, international version of the American TV channel Nicktoons, the network serves many of the countries in the European Union, and features several feeds differentiated by time zones and local languages being the primary audio feed offered, with other languages offered through second audio program options. Other networks may display the domestic language as open-access subtitles.

Programming

History 
Channel launched on 1st February 2017 but 15 days later launched on Middle East and North Africa and another 5 days Turkish Feed on 15 February 2018 at 10:00 AM (at polish time) Nickelodeon HD got replaced by Nicktoons 12 December 2018 Nicktoons Launched in Russia 1 April 2019 Launched of Hungarian And Romanian Feeds 5 June 2019 in Bulgaria 30 October 2019 Czech feed 22 January 2020 Ukraine Feed on 14 July 2020 launched as 4 Feeds Serbian Croatian Slovenian and Albanian Feed 28 April 2022 channel shutdown in Russia December 14 2022 Belarusian feed Channel work 24 hours.

External links 
 Polish website
 Romanian website
 Hungarian website
 Bulgarian website
 Czech website

Nicktoons (TV network)
Children's television networks
Television channels and stations established in 2017
2017 establishments in Europe